The 1955 Gent–Wevelgem was the 17th edition of the Gent–Wevelgem cycle race and was held on 3 April 1955. The race started in Ghent and finished in Wevelgem. The race was won by Briek Schotte.

General classification

References

Gent–Wevelgem
1955 in road cycling
1955 in Belgian sport
April 1955 sports events in Europe